Hanuman Singh Rathore is a noted former basketball player from India. He played for India in Asian Games, Commonwealth Games and at 1980 Olympics.
He was awarded Arjuna Award in 1975. Born in 1950 in Nagaur district of Rajasthan state. He studied at Military School, Ajmer. He represented Indian Railways in national tournaments. He is now employed with SAIL.

References

External links
 

Indian men's basketball players
Olympic basketball players of India
Recipients of the Arjuna Award
Basketball players from Rajasthan
People from Nagaur district
1950 births
Living people
Rajasthani people
Basketball players at the 1980 Summer Olympics